Namea is a genus of spiders in the family Anamidae. It was first described in 1984 by Raven. , it contains 19 species, all from Queensland and New South Wales.

Species

Namea comprises the following species:
Namea brisbanensis Raven, 1984 — Australia (Queensland)
Namea bunya Raven, 1984 — Australia (Queensland)
Namea calcaria Raven, 1984 — Australia (Queensland)
Namea callemonda Raven, 1984 — Australia (Queensland)
Namea capricornia Raven, 1984 — Australia (Queensland)
Namea cucurbita Raven, 1984 — Australia (Queensland)
Namea dahmsi Raven, 1984 — Australia (Queensland)
Namea dicalcaria Raven, 1984 — Australia (New South Wales)
Namea excavans Raven, 1984 — Australia (Queensland)
Namea flavomaculata (Rainbow & Pulleine, 1918) — Australia (Queensland)
Namea gloriosa Rix, Wilson & Harvey, 2020 — Australia (Queensland)
Namea gowardae Rix, Wilson & Harvey, 2020 — Australia (Queensland)
Namea jimna Raven, 1984 — Australia (Queensland)
Namea nebo Rix, Wilson & Harvey, 2020 — Australia (Queensland)
Namea nebulosa Raven, 1984 — Australia (Queensland)
Namea nigritarsus Rix, Wilson & Harvey, 2020 — Australia (Queensland)
Namea olympus Raven, 1984 — Australia (Queensland)
Namea salanitri Raven, 1984 — Australia (Queensland, New South Wales)
Namea saundersi Raven, 1984 — Australia (Queensland)

References

Anamidae
Mygalomorphae genera
Spiders of Australia